Socl may refer to:
So.cl, a social networking website by Microsoft.
Sulfinyl chloride, sulfinyl halides with the general formula R-S(O)-Cl.